Mesochiton is an extinct genus of polyplacophoran molluscs. Mosochiton became extinct during the Jurassic period.

References 

Prehistoric chiton genera
Jurassic molluscs